(formerly Grande 21 General Gymnasium and Hot House Super Arena) is a multi-purpose indoor arena in the Grande 21 Complex in Rifu, Miyagi, Japan. The capacity of the arena is 7,063 and was opened in 1997.

The Sekisui Heim Super Arena is located next to the Miyagi Stadium.

Gallery

External links
 Stadium information 

Basketball venues in Japan
Indoor arenas in Japan
Sendai 89ers
Sports venues in Miyagi Prefecture
Sports venues completed in 1997
1997 establishments in Japan
Rifu, Miyagi